Reyer Anslo (1622 or 1626 – 16 May 1669) was a Dutch poet.

Life

Anslo was born at Amsterdam and brought up a Mennonite. He was baptized in 1646. Early civic fame as a poet came to him in Amsterdam, when he was rewarded by his with a laurel crown and a silver dish for a poem in honour of the foundation stone of the new town hall in 1648. In 1649 he travelled to Rome with Arnout Hellemans Hooft (1629-1680), the son of P.C. Hooft; they arrived in November 1651.
In December he was received into the Catholic Church, together with forty-three others, as is shown by manuscript records of the Society of Jesus (Lit. annuae Soc. Jes., in the Burgundian Library at Brussels, VI, No. 21818b fo 300, ao 1651). He proceeded to Rome, where he became secretary to Cardinal Luigi Capponi, and received from Pope Innocent X a gold medal for his poetical labours. In 1655 he was presented to Queen Christina of Sweden, to whom he dedicated new poems. A poem entitled De Zweedsche Pallas ("The Swedish Pallas"), brought him a golden chain. 
He died at Perugia.

Works

Anslo's collected works were published in 1713. They include a tragedy, "The Parisian Blood-Bridal" (De parysche bloed-bruiloff, 1649), dealing with the Massacre of St. Bartholomew. He wrote an epic on The Plague at Naples (1656).

Notes

References

Attribution
 The entry cites:
Peter Paul Maria Alberdingk Thijm in Kirchenlexikon;
, in the Dietsache Warande (Amsterdam);
, Spiegel van Nederlandsche Letteren (Louvain, 1877, II, III).

External link

1622 births
1669 deaths
17th-century Dutch poets
Catholic poets
Dutch male poets
Dutch Roman Catholics
Writers from Amsterdam
Converts to Roman Catholicism from Mennonitism
Dutch Mennonites
Mennonite writers
Mennonite poets